HeroPoker was a Philippines-focused online poker room.

Established in January 2011 by founder and CEO David Jung, who previously worked for Pokerstars as the “Asia Pacific Poker Tour (APPT) Senior Business Development Manager” in 2007 and “Regional Marketing Director of Asia” in 2008.  Jung at the time, set up the largest poker room in Asia that hosted APPT and Macau Poker Cup, which he established in his time with PokerStars at the Grand Lisboa Casino in Macau. Jung left Pokerstars in March 2010 to set up his own online gaming company under the “Hero” brand in January 2011.

At the time of its establishment in January 2011, HeroPoker accepted players from United States.  On May 25, 2011, Jung announced its exit of US market.  On December 20, 2012, HeroPoker made its exit from the Merge Gaming Network while transferring their entire player base to the Merge Gaming Network. HeroPoker departed among a wave of departures from the Merge Gaming Network. CEO David Jung stated: "Simply put, Hero and Merge weren’t going the same direction any longer and it just didn’t make sense on both sides to continue, sometimes in business and most times in life, things work out like this, but again, the priority has been the players and in this respect, Merge has put the players first in this transition process as well, so I’m thankful for that."

After leaving Merge Gaming Network, HeroPoker obtained a gaming license in the Philippines. It operated an online poker website until April 2017. The website went offline in May 2017.

References

External links 
 

Defunct poker companies
Internet properties established in 2011
Internet properties disestablished in 2017
Gambling companies established in 2011
Gambling companies disestablished in 2017